Styllangium, Styllangion, or Stylangion ( and Στυλλάγιον) was a town of Triphylia in ancient Elis.

Its site is tentatively located near modern Gryllos.

References

Populated places in ancient Elis
Former populated places in Greece
Triphylia